The 2013 Men's Queensland Basketball League season was the 28th running of the competition. The Rockhampton Rockets won the championship in 2013 to claim their fourth league title.

The teams for this season were: Brisbane Capitals, Bundaberg Bulls, Cairns Marlins, Gladstone Port City Power, Gold Coast Rollers, Ipswich Force, Mackay Meteors, Northside Wizards, Rockhampton Rockets, South West Metro Pirates, Suncoast Clippers, Toowoomba Mountaineers and Townsville Heat.

Team information

Standings

Finals

*The team that finishes 1st overall goes straight through to the semi-finals.

**The top two teams from each pool face-off in the quarter-finals.

QF 1: 1st in Pool A vs. 2nd in Pool A
QF 2: 1st in Pool B vs. 2nd in Pool C
QF 3: 1st in Pool C vs. 2nd in Pool B

Awards

Player of the Week

Coach of the Month

Statistics leaders

Regular season
 Most Valuable Player: Winston Robinson (Suncoast Clippers)
 Coach of the Year: Jamie Pearlman (Cairns Marlins)
 U23 Youth Player of the Year: Mitch McCarron (Northside Wizards)
 All-League Team:
 G: Braydon Hobbs (Gladstone Port City Power)
 G: Shaun Gleeson (Gladstone Port City Power)
 F: Winston Robinson (Suncoast Clippers)
 F: Stephen Weigh (Rockhampton Rockets)
 C: Dusty Rychart (Brisbane Capitals)

Finals
 Grand Final MVP: Mitch Philp (Rockhampton Rockets)

Notes

References

External links
 2013 QBL Official Draw
 Quarter-finals Preview
 Quarter-finals Wrap
 Semi-finals Preview
 Grand Final Preview
 Grand Final Wrap

2013
2012–13 in Australian basketball
2013–14 in Australian basketball